Stuttgart Computer Museum (Computermuseum der Stuttgarter Informatik) is a collection of calculators, mechanical calculating machines, and analog and digital computers at the Vaihingen campus of University of Stuttgart, Germany established in 1997.

Highlights of the collection include several DEC PDP-8 and DEC PDP-11 models, an IBM 1130, and a LGP-30 vacuum tube-based computer. Many items in the collection are in fully working condition and are available for demonstrations.

References

External links
 Official website
 
 

Computer museums
Museums established in 1997
Computer